Caitlin Sweet is a Canadian fantasy author and writer at the Ontario Government who teaches a genre writing workshop at the University of Toronto's School of Continuing Studies. She lives in Toronto with her family, which includes two children and her husband, hard science fiction author Peter Watts.

Works
A Telling of Stars (2003) 
The Silences of Home (2005)
The Pattern Scars (2011)
The Door in the Mountain (2014)
The Flame in the Maze (2015)

Awards
A Telling of Stars (2003), finalist at the 2004 Prix Aurora Awards and nominated for the 2004 Locus Awards.; honorable mention for the 2004 Sunburst Award
The Silences of Home (2005), finalist at the 2006 Prix Aurora Awards. 
The Pattern Scars (2011),  finalist for the 2012 Prix Aurora Awards; winner of the 2012 CBC Bookie Award in the Best Science Fiction, Fantasy, or Speculative Fiction category
The Door in the Mountain (2014), finalist for the Sunburst Award; winner of the Copper Cylinder Award,
The Flame in the Maze (2015)

References

External links
Caitlin Sweet's website

Following the Thread : The story behind The Door in the Mountain - Online Essay by Caitlin Sweet
CBC Second Annual Bookie Awards
Quill & Quire - Copper Cylinder Award

Year of birth missing (living people)
Living people
Canadian fantasy writers
Canadian women novelists
21st-century Canadian women writers
Writers from Toronto